St. John's Church (Chinese: 圣约翰教堂; Foochow Romanized: Séng Iók-hâng Gáu-dòng) is an abandoned Anglican church located in Lequn Street No. 9, Cangshan District, Fuzhou, China. It is also known in the Foochow vernacular as "石厝教堂" (Siŏh-chuó Gáu-dòng, lit., Stone House Church). Completed in 1860, the church was donated by British people living in Fuzhou in 1858. The church is of a typical Gothic style. T. C. Walkers was the engineer who designed the building.

The site of the church was initially over 1000m2, and the footprint of the building is around 320m2.

The site of the church was nominated as "Historical Protection Site" in 1992. However, it is now occupied by a military unit as a printing factory, and is in a poor state of disrepair.

Photo gallery

References

Former Anglican churches in China
Churches in Fuzhou
Churches completed in 1860
Former churches in China
Gothic Revival church buildings in China